Julio César Urías Meda (born January 11, 1972) is a retired male race walker from Guatemala. He won the bronze medal in the men's 50 km race walk event at the 1995 Pan American Games in Mar del Plata, Argentina, where he set his personal best - 3:49.37 on 24 March 1995.

Personal bests
20 km: 1:23:58 hrs –  Guatemala, 2 Septiembre 1994
50 km: 3:49:37 hrs –  Mar del Plata, 24 March 1995

Achievements

References

 
 

1972 births
Living people
Guatemalan male racewalkers
Athletes (track and field) at the 1995 Pan American Games
Athletes (track and field) at the 1996 Summer Olympics
Olympic athletes of Guatemala
Pan American Games bronze medalists for Guatemala
Pan American Games medalists in athletics (track and field)
Central American and Caribbean Games bronze medalists for Guatemala
Central American Games gold medalists for Guatemala
Central American Games medalists in athletics
Competitors at the 1993 Central American and Caribbean Games
Central American and Caribbean Games medalists in athletics
Medalists at the 1995 Pan American Games
20th-century Guatemalan people
21st-century Guatemalan people